Zhu Xu (15 April 1930 – 15 September 2018) was a Chinese actor. He was well known for his roles in Zhang Yang's Shower and Wu Tianming's The King of Masks, the latter film winning him the Best Actor prize at the Tokyo International Film Festival.

Filmography
  The Street Players (1987)
 Li Lianying: The Imperial Eunuch aka. The Last Eunuch (1991) - Prince Chun
  The True-Hearted aka. Heartstrings (1992)
  A Confucius Family (1993) - Kong Lingtan
 The King of Masks (1996) - Wang Bianlian, the "King of Masks"
 Shower (1999) - Master Liu
  Beijing Herbs  (2000) - Guan Juchen
 The Gua Sha Treatment (2001) - Father
  Ôsama no kampô (2004)
 Lan (2009)

References

External links
 
Zhu Xu at the Chinese Movie Database

1930 births
2018 deaths
Chinese male stage actors
Male actors from Liaoning
Male actors from Shenyang
Chinese male film actors
Chinese male television actors